Plaza de la Bandera is a plaza and roundabout in Guadalajara, in the Mexican state of Jalisco. In 1943, a stone sculpture of an eagle and flagpole were installed in the roundabout.

References

External links

 

Guadalajara, Jalisco
Plazas in Jalisco
Roundabouts and traffic circles in Mexico